Tripura Rajya Muslim Praja Majlish was Muslim political party in Tripura, India, formed around 1946. The party competed with Anjuman Islamia over the political influence over the Muslim community, but failed to make any lasting impact.

See Also
Politics of Tripura

References

Politics of Tripura
Defunct political parties in Tripura
1946 establishments in India
Political parties established in 1946